Eduardo Ramos de Souza (born November 3, 1944) is a Brazilian former Olympic sailor in the Star class. He competed in the 1980 Summer Olympics together with Peter Erzberger, where they finished 9th, and in the 1984 Summer Olympics together with Roberto Souza, where they finished 12th.

References

1944 births
Living people
Olympic sailors of Brazil
Brazilian male sailors (sport)
Star class sailors
Sailors at the 1980 Summer Olympics – Star
Sailors at the 1984 Summer Olympics – Star
Place of birth missing (living people)
European Champions Soling